Tarnopol is an unincorporated community in Saskatchewan, Canada, located 50 km southwest of the city of Melfort. It was settled mostly by Ukrainian and Polish immigrants in the early 1900s. Tarnopol gets its name from Ternopil, Ukraine, which was formerly known as Tarnopol when that district was part of the Imperial Austrian province of Galicia.

See also 
 List of communities in Saskatchewan
 List of ghost towns in Canada
 Ghost towns in Saskatchewan

References 

Unincorporated communities in Saskatchewan
Ghost towns in Saskatchewan
Invergordon No. 430, Saskatchewan
Polish-Canadian culture
Ukrainian-Canadian culture in Saskatchewan
Division No. 15, Saskatchewan